Cantharellus spectaculus is a species of fungus in the genus Cantharellus. Found in North America, it was described as new to science in 2013.

References

External links

spectaculus
Fungi described in 2013
Fungi of North America
Edible fungi